Ayúdame a ser tuyo is the third  album by Puerto Rican actor and singer Sergio Blass, It was released in 1998

Track listing
 "Son así" (Robinson, Solomon, St. John) – 4:53 
 "Por un café por un helao" (Juan Eduardo, Ramiro Teran) – 4:28
 "Completamente tocado" (Gomez, Perez) – 5:58 
 "Ámame" (Lopez, Moles) – 4:39
 "Ayúdame a ser tuyo" (Rosa Giron, Carlos Goméz, Mariano Perez) – 4:15
 "Tiriti" (Losada, Perez) – 3:38 
 "Ella provoca" (Losada, Perez) – 4:16
 "Taxi" (Camacho, Joaquín Sabina) – 3:53
 "Embustero" (Oscar DePalma, Elio DePalma) – 4:15
 "Amor multiplicado por dos" (Lopez, Pinilla) – 3:39
 "Miénteme" (Ketama, Perez) – 5:09

Personnel 
Isaías G. Asbun – mixing
Mariano Perez Bautista – producer
Sergio Blass – vocals, backing vocals
Juan Carlos – backing vocals
Juan Cerro – acoustic guitar
Carlos Goméz – arranger, string director
Javier Losada – arranger, keyboards, sequencing
Carlos Martos – engineer
Arturo Medellin – art direction
Andy Pask – bass
Mariano Perez – percussion, mixing
David Revuelto – arranger, keyboards, sequencing
Carlos Somonte – photography
Mariana Somonte – wardrobe coordinator

1998 albums
Sergio Blass albums